Aydora is a town in central Ethiopia of the Somali Region in the Shinile Zone.

Demographics
The 2005 census reported this town had a total population of 2,168 of whom 1,163 were men and 1,005 women. The ethnic groups reported in this town were the Somali (99.00%) all other ethnic groups made up the remaining 0.99% of the residents.

References 

Populated places in the Somali Region